Nijetrijne  is a small village in Weststellingwerf in the province of Friesland, the Netherlands, with a population of around 113 as of 2017.

There are three windmills in the village; De Reiger, De Rietvink, and a tjasker, the Boktjasker.

History 
The village was first mentioned in 1320 as Nienwestrinde, and means "new border line". Nije (new) has been added to distinguish from Oldetrijne. The Dutch Reformed dates from 1919.

Nijetrijne was home to 120 in 1840.

Gallery

References

External links

Geography of Weststellingwerf
Populated places in Friesland